The Long Live Montero Tour was the debut concert tour by American rapper and singer Lil Nas X, in support of his debut studio album, Montero (2021). The tour spanned across North America and Europe, beginning on September 6, 2022, in Detroit, Michigan, and concluded in Barcelona on November 17, 2022. In September 2022, it was announced that artist will play an exclusive show located at the Hordern Pavilion in Sydney, on January 4, 2023.

Background 
On April 26, 2022, Lil Nas X announced a concert tour to support the debut album, Montero. The tour, titled Long Live Montero Tour, will be his first headlining concert tour, and set to begin on September 6, 2022 in Detroit, and conclude on November 17, 2022 in Barcelona. Tickets for North American dates went on sale on April 29, with European dates to follow on May 6. Mobile payment service, Cash App, held pre-sales for North American dates on April 27 via Ticketmaster. In early September of 2022, the artist announced that he'll play an exclusive show in Sydney. The show is set at the Hordern Pavilion on January 4, 2023.

Setlist 
The setlist was revealed after Lil Nas X performed his first show on September 6, 2022, at the Fox Theatre.

 "Panini"
 "Tales of Dominica"
 "Sun Goes Down"
 "Old Town Road" / "Rodeo"
"Dead Right Now"
 "Dont Want It"
 "Thats What I Want"
 "Lost in the Citadel"
 "Montero (Call Me by Your Name)"
 "Down Souf Hoes"
 "Scoop"
 "Industry Baby"

Encore
 "Star Walkin' (League of Legends Worlds Anthem)"

Notes
 On multiple dates, Lil Nas X and his dancers followed the performance of "Don't Want It" with a brief dance interpretation of "Pure/Honey" by Beyoncé, which transitioned into "Thats What I Want".

Shows

Notes

References 

Concert tours
2022 concert tours
2023 concert tours
Concert tours of North America
Concert tours of Europe
Concert tours of Australia
Lil Nas X